Canada Party may refer to:

Canada Party, federal Canadian political party established in 1993
Canada Party (2015), Canadian political party established in 1993, led by former MP Jim Pankiw
The Canada Party, Canadian satirical group